John Halton was an MP.

John Halton may also refer to:

John Halton (anaesthetist), see Ye Cracke
John de Halton (died 1324), English priest, bishop of Carlisle